Thalassotalea piscium  is a Gram-negative, rod-shaped and aerobic bacterium from the genus of Thalassotalea which has been isolated from a cultivated flounder.

References

 

Alteromonadales
Bacteria described in 2014